Spare the Rod is a 1954 American animated short film directed by Jack Hannah and produced by Walt Disney, featuring Donald Duck. In the short film, while Donald is doing yard work, his nephews are playing games instead of doing their chores. He is going to punish them, but the "voice of child psychology" convinces him to play along instead. This works well when they chop the wood to burn him at the stake. Meanwhile, however, a trio of Pygmy cannibals that escaped from the circus are out to do the very same thing to Donald with a cauldron of water...

Plot 
Donald is doing his yard work and expecting his nephews - they keep sneaking off to play their pretend game, "Indians on the warpath." Then, he used his typical strong arm tactics to send his nephews to do their chores. Later, a little shoulder professor called, "child psychologist" convinces Donald to join in the games, using the game for the nephews' chores. Complicating matters are the cannibals, who have escaped from a circus. They spot Donald and think he would make great duck stew. But, Donald mistakes the cannibals for his nephews playing games and plays along until his real nephews play with him, realizing the other three are real cannibals. His nephews take off in fear while the cannibals try to cook Donald, who is praying for his life to be spared until one of the cannibals bites Donald to "taste" him. Donald loses his temper and takes the cannibal out to the woodshed. Then, the cannibals escape out of Donald's place. While Donald staring at his nephews, he taunted them back to chop their wood for the second time. Ashamed of Donald listening to the "child psychologist", he takes him to the woodshed as well.

Voice cast 
 Clarence Nash as Donald Duck, Huey, Dewey, and Louie
 Bill Thompson as The Voice of Child Psychology
 Pinto Colvig as Pygmy Cannibals

Censorship 
Because Spare the Rod depicted racial stereotypes of native Africans via the appearances of the pygmy cannibals, though being also red-nosed anthropomorphic animals, all scenes depicting the cannibals are deleted when shown on television. The censored version of the short is rendered very short, since its runtime has been greatly reduced from 6 minutes (not counting credits) to  minutes.

The fully restored version is available on Walt Disney Treasures: The Chronological Donald, Volume Four.

Home media
The short was released on November 11, 2008, on Walt Disney Treasures: The Chronological Donald, Volume Four: 1951-1961.

References

External links 
 
 Spare the Rod at The Internet Animation Database
 Spare the Rod on Filmaffinity

Donald Duck short films
Films produced by Walt Disney
1950s Disney animated short films
Films directed by Jack Hannah
Film controversies
Race-related controversies in animation
Race-related controversies in film
Disney controversies
Ethnic humour
Stereotypes of black people
1954 animated films
1954 films
Films scored by Oliver Wallace
1950s English-language films